Selver Hodžić (born 12 October 1978) is a Bosnian-Herzegovinian and Swiss former professional footballer who played as a defender.

Playing career
Born in Brčko, SR Bosnia and Herzegovina, Yugoslavia, Hodžić came to Switzerland as a war refugee in 1993. He played for Zug 94 until 1999, whereupon Hodžić played for a couple of other clubs before signing with FC Thun in 2002.

On 27 September 2005, Hodžić became FC Thun's hero with a dramatic winner in the 89th minute against Czech champions Sparta Prague.

On 25 June 2007, the player signed a two-year contract with Israeli Bnei Yehuda Tel Aviv F.C.

At the end of the season, he transferred back to Switzerland to Neuchâtel Xamax.

Managerial career
Hodzic became a youth coach at Luzern and later manager of his former club Buochs, but left them in 2019.

References

1978 births
Living people
People from Brčko District
Bosnia and Herzegovina emigrants to Switzerland
Swiss people of Bosnia and Herzegovina descent
Association football defenders
Swiss men's footballers
Bosnia and Herzegovina footballers
FC Luzern players
FC Baden players
FC Thun players
Bnei Yehuda Tel Aviv F.C. players
Neuchâtel Xamax FCS players
FC Lugano players
FC Wohlen players
Swiss Super League players
Israeli Premier League players
Swiss Challenge League players
Swiss expatriate footballers
Bosnia and Herzegovina expatriate footballers
Expatriate footballers in Israel
Bosnia and Herzegovina expatriate sportspeople in Israel
Swiss expatriate sportspeople in Israel